Surben or Sur Bon may refer to:
 Surben, Babol
 Sur Bon, Miandorud